New Policy (born 1957) was an American Thoroughbred racehorse sired by Khaled and trained by John H. Adams shortly after his retirement as a jockey.

He was the grandsire of Town Policy (1975–1984) by Reb's Policy (b. 1967).

External links
Pedigree at Pedigreequery

1957 racehorse births
Racehorses bred in California
Racehorses trained in the United States
Thoroughbred family 20-a